Badminton at the 1979 Southeast Asian Games was held at  Jakarta. Badminton events was held between 21 - 30 September 1979.

Medal winners

Semifinal results

Final results

Medal table

References

External links 
HISTORY OF THE SEA GAMES, olympic.org.my

1979
1979 in badminton
1979 in Indonesian sport
Badminton tournaments in Indonesia
Sports competitions in Jakarta